This is a list of notable industry trade groups in the United States.

National

Advertising, business, marketing

Ad 2
AMC Institute
American Advertising Federation
American Association of Advertising Agencies
American Independent Business Alliance
American Marketing Association
Association for Convention Operations Management
Association of Chamber of Commerce Executives
Association of National Advertisers
Center for Audit Quality
Commercial Real Estate Women
Community Associations Institute
Compete America
Council of American Survey Research Organizations
Graphic Arts Technical Foundation
Institute for Supply Management
International Council of Shopping Centers
International Intellectual Property Alliance
Marketing Research Association
Million Dollar Round Table
National Association of Real Estate Brokers
National Association of Realtors
Outdoor Advertising Association of America
Produce Marketing Association
Promotion Marketing Association
Public Relations Society of America
United States Chamber of Commerce

Agriculture

American Ambulance Association
American Animal Hospital Association
American Christmas Tree Association
American Corn Growers Association
American Equestrian Trade Association
American Hereford Association
American Horse Council
Corn Refiners Association
CropLife International
Farm Foundation
Grocery Manufacturers Association
Hemp Industries Association

Clothing, apparel, footwear, fashion 

American Apparel & Footwear Association
Fashion Originators' Guild of America
Council of Fashion Designers of America

Construction 

American Institute of Constructors
American Subcontractors Association
Associated Builders and Contractors
Associated General Contractors of America
IAPMO (International Association of Plumbing and Mechanical Officials)
Independent Electrical Contractors
Mason Contractors Association of America
Metal Construction Association
National Association of Construction Auditors
National Association of Home Builders
National Roofing Contractors Association
Pipe Line Contractors Association

Energy

Air Conditioning, Heating and Refrigeration Institute
American Gas Association
American Petroleum Institute
American Public Gas Association
American Public Power Association
American Wind Energy Association
Atomic Industrial Forum
Edison Electric Institute
Geothermal Energy Association
International Renewable Energy Alliance
National Rural Electric Cooperative Association
Pellet Fuels Institute
Sheet Metal and Air Conditioning Contractors' National Association
Solar Energy Industries Association
United States Energy Association

Entertainment and leisure

American Amusement Machine Association
American Pyrotechnics Association
American Society of Travel Agents
Archery Trade Association
Asian American Hotel Owners Association
The Broadway League
Diving Equipment and Marketing Association (DEMA)
Entertainment Software Association
Fantasy Sports Trade Association
Game Manufacturers Association
Golf Course Superintendents Association of America
Hotel Technology Next Generation
International Art Materials Trade Association
International Association of Travel Agents Network
International Festivals and Events Association
International Inbound Travel Association
Professional Lighting and Sound Association
Recreational Software Advisory Council

Financial, insurance 

ACA International
American Bankers Association
American Council of Life Insurers
American Credit Union Mortgage Association
American Financial Services Association
America's Health Insurance Plans
Bank Policy Institute
Consumer Bankers Association
Credit Union National Association
Financial Industry Regulatory Authority
Financial Services Forum
Financial Services Roundtable
Futures Industry Association
Independent Community Bankers of America
International Securities Lending Association
Mortgage Bankers Association
Organization for International Investment
Regional Bond Dealers Association
Risk and Insurance Management Society
SWACHA (Southwestern Automated Clearing House Association)

Food

American Beverage Association
American Beverage Institute
American Frozen Food Institute
American Meat Institute
American Mushroom Institute
American Pie Council
Beer Institute
Bread Bakers Guild of America
Brewers Association
Council for Responsible Nutrition
Distilled Spirits Council of the United States
Food Products Association
International Association of Operative Millers
International Bottled Water Association
International Dairy-Deli-Bakery Association
International Foodservice Distributors Association
Juice Products Association
Retailer Owned Food Distributors & Associates
Specialty Coffee Association of America
Specialty Wine Retailers Association
U.S. Poultry & Egg Association
United States Brewers' Association
Wine and Spirits Wholesalers of America

Industry

The Aluminum Association
American Bar Association
American Bearing Manufacturers Association
American Chemistry Council
American Cleaning Institute
American Composites Manufacturers Association
American Forest & Paper Association
American Gear Manufacturers Association
American Hardware Manufacturers Association
American Home Furnishings Alliance
American Iron and Steel Institute
American National Standards Institute
American Plastics Council
American Watchmakers-Clockmakers Institute
American Water Works Association
American Welding Society
ASHRAE (American Society of Heating, Refrigerating and Air-Conditioning Engineers)
Associated Equipment Distributors
Associated Locksmiths of America
Association for Manufacturing Technology
Association for Materials Protection and Performance
Battery Council International
Bearing Specialists Association
Can Manufacturers Institute
Closure & Container Manufacturers Association
Compressed Air and Gas Institute
Cordage Institute
Crane Manufacturers Association of America
Energy and Minerals Business Council
Fire Equipment Manufacturers' Association
Glass Packaging Institute
Hearth, Patio & Barbecue Association
Household & Commercial Products Association
Institute of Boiler and Radiator Manufacturers
Institute of Scrap Recycling Industries
International Association of Elevator Consultants
International Association of Plastics Distributors
International Association of Refrigerated Warehouses
International Card Manufacturers Association
International Council on Mining and Metals
International Electrical Testing Association
International Housewares Association
International Imaging Industry Association
Juvenile Products Manufacturers Association
Legal Marketing Association
Metal Building Manufacturers Association
Mineral Information Institute
National Defense Industrial Association
National Electrical Manufacturers Association
National Retail Federation
Plumbing Manufacturers International
Precision Machined Products Association
Professional Electrical Apparatus Recyclers League
Professional Photographers of America
Resilient Floor Covering Institute
Retail Industry Leaders Association
Security Industry Association
Society of Chemical Manufacturers and Affiliates
TAPPI (Technical Association of the Pulp and Paper Industry)

IT, communications and electronics

American Council for Technology and Industry Advisory Council
Chamber of Progress
CompTIA (Computing Technology Industry Association)
Consumer Technology Association
CTIA (– The Wireless Association)
Electronic Industries Alliance
Federation of Internet Solution Providers of the Americas
International Informix Users Group
International Interactive Communications Society
Fiber Optic Sensing Association
International Webmasters Association
JEDEC Solid State Technology Association
 National Wireless Independent Dealer Association
Open Mashup Alliance
Satellite Broadcasting and Communications Association
SD Association
Society for Information Management
Storage Networking Industry Association
TechAmerica
Trusted Computing Group
United States Telecom Association

Media

Alliance of Motion Picture and Television Producers
American Association of Independent Music
American Booksellers Association
American Publishers Association
American Society of Magazine Editors
Association for International Broadcasting
Association of American Publishers
Association of Comics Magazine Publishers
Association of Learned and Professional Society Publishers
Book Industry Study Group
Community Broadcasters Association
Evangelical Press Association
Free Speech Coalition
IABM (International Association for Broadcast & Media Technology Suppliers)
Independent Book Publishers Association
Independent Film & Television Alliance
Inland Press Association
International Association of Scientific, Technical, and Medical Publishers
Motion Picture Association of America
MPA – the Association of Magazine Media
National Association of Broadcasters
Print Services & Distribution Association
Printing Industries of America
Producers Guild of America
Recording Industry Association of America
Screen Actors Guild

Medicine, medical devices, pharmaceuticals and environment

AABB (American Association of Blood Banks)
AdvaMed
American Herbal Products Association
American Hospital Association
American Medical Association
American Pet Products Association
American Pharmacists Association
Bio Process Systems Alliance
Biotechnology Innovation Organization
Care Continuum Alliance
Catholic Health Association of the United States
Congress of Chiropractic State Associations
Federation of American Hospitals
International Solid Waste Association
National Committee for Quality Assurance
Pharmaceutical care management association
Pharmaceutical Research and Manufacturers of America
The Vision Council

Tobacco, alcohol, law, politics, gambling and firearms

American Association of Political Consultants
American Association of Professional Landmen
American Bar Association
American Land Title Association
Council on State Taxation
International Stability Operations Association
National Shooting Sports Foundation
Tobacco Institute
National Defense Industrial Association

Transport and logistics

Aerospace Industries Association
Airports Council International
Alliance of Automobile Manufacturers
American Association of Port Authorities
American Bus Association
American Moving & Storage Association
American Public Transportation Association
American Railway Association
American Road and Transportation Builders Association
American Trucking Associations
American Waterways Operators
Association of American Railroads
AutoCare Association
Automobile Manufacturers Association
Automotive Industry Action Group
Commercial Spaceflight Federation
Driving Schools Association of the Americas
Modification and Replacement Parts Association
Motorcycle Industry Council
National Automobile Dealers Association
National Motor Freight Traffic Association
Personal Watercraft Industry Association
Railway Tie Association
SEMA (Specialty Equipment Market Association)

State and local

Media

Alabama Broadcasters Association
California Newspaper Publishers Association
Georgia Association of Broadcasters
Kansas Association of Broadcasters
Massachusetts Broadcasters Association
Michigan Association of Broadcasters
Minnesota Public Television Association
Pennsylvania Association of Broadcasters
Pennsylvania NewsMedia Association

Other

Austin Independent Business Alliance
California Avocado Commission
California Building Industry Association
Georgia Hospital Association
Independent Petroleum Association of Mountain States
International Business Council of Florida
Massachusetts Bar Association
Ohio Credit Union System
Pacific Maritime Association
Southern United States Trade Association
Tavern League of Wisconsin
Tech Council of Maryland
Texas and Southwestern Cattle Raisers Association
Western States Petroleum Association
Wyoming Stock Growers Association

References 

 
United States
United States